The Messe Erfurt is a convention center including an indoor arena, in Erfurt, Germany. Its seating capacity is roughly 12,000 people.

The arena has hosted concerts by many famous artists, spanning many different genres.

It serves as home arena for the Rockets (basketball club).

External links

Convention centres in Germany
Indoor arenas in Germany
Sport in Erfurt
Sports venues in Thuringia
Buildings and structures in Erfurt